F19 or F-19 may refer to:
 F-19, a designation for a hypothetical United States fighter aircraft
 Faucett F-19, a 1940s Peruvian eight-seat transport monoplane
 Focke-Wulf F 19, a German aircraft
 Fluorine-19 (F-19 or 19F), an isotope of fluorine